Saskia Bricmont (born 16 March 1985) is a Belgian politician who was elected as a Member of the European Parliament in 2019.

Political career
In parliament, Bricmont serves on the Committee on Civil Liberties, Justice and Home Affairs (since 2019) and the Committee on International Trade (since 2020). In 2022, she joined the Committee of Inquiry to investigate the use of Pegasus and equivalent surveillance spyware.  

In addition to her committee assignments, Bricmont is part of the Parliament's delegation for relations with the Maghreb countries and the Arab Maghreb Union. She is also a member of the European Parliament Intergroup on Children’s Rights, the European Parliament Intergroup on LGBT Rights, the European Parliament Intergroup on the Welfare and Conservation of Animals and the Responsible Business Conduct Working Group.

References

1985 births
Living people
MEPs for Belgium 2019–2024
21st-century women MEPs for Belgium
Politicians from Tournai
Ecolo MEPs
Ecolo politicians